Metabolic control analysis (MCA) is a mathematical framework for describing
metabolic, signaling, and genetic pathways. MCA quantifies how variables,  such as fluxes and species concentrations, depend on network parameters.
In particular, it is able to describe how network-dependent properties,
called control coefficients, depend on local properties called elasticities or Elasticity Coefficients.

MCA was originally developed to describe the control in metabolic pathways
but was subsequently extended to describe signaling and genetic networks. MCA has sometimes also been referred to as Metabolic Control Theory, but this terminology was rather strongly opposed by Henrik Kacser, one of the founders.

More recent work has shown that MCA can be mapped directly on to classical control theory and are as such equivalent.

Biochemical systems theory is a similar formalism, though with rather different objectives. Both are evolutions of an earlier theoretical analysis by Joseph Higgins.

Control coefficients 

A control coefficient
 measures the relative steady state change in a system variable, e.g. pathway flux (J) or metabolite concentration (S), in response to a relative change in a parameter, e.g. enzyme activity or the steady-state rate of step . The two main control coefficients are the flux and concentration control coefficients. Flux control coefficients are defined by

and concentration control coefficients by

.

Summation theorems 
The flux control summation theorem was discovered independently by the Kacser/Burns group and the Heinrich/Rapoport group in the early 1970s and late 1960s. The flux control summation theorem implies that metabolic fluxes are systemic properties and that their control is shared by all reactions in the system. When a single reaction changes its control of the flux this is compensated by changes in the control of the same flux by all other reactions.

Elasticity coefficients 

The elasticity coefficient measures the local response of an enzyme or other chemical reaction to changes in its environment. Such changes include factors such as substrates, products, or effector concentrations. For further information, please refer to the dedicated page at elasticity coefficients.

.

Connectivity theorems 

The connectivity theorems are specific relationships between elasticities and control coefficients. They are useful because they highlight the close relationship between the kinetic properties of individual reactions and the system properties of a pathway. Two basic sets of theorems exists, one for flux and another for concentrations. The concentration connectivity theorems are divided again depending on whether the system species  is different from the local species .

Control equations 

It is possible to combine the summation with the connectivity theorems to obtain closed expressions that relate the control coefficients to the elasticity coefficients. For example, consider the simplest non-trivial pathway:

Let the first step have a rate  and the second step . Focusing on the flux control coefficients, we can write one summation and one connectivity theorem for this simple pathway:

Using these two equations we can solve for the flux control coefficients to yield

Using these equations we can look at some simple extreme behaviors. For example, let us assume that the first step is completely insensitive to its product (i.e. not reacting with it), S, then . In this case, the control coefficients reduce to

That is all the control (or sensitivity) is on the first step. This situation represents the classic rate-limiting step that is frequently mentioned in text books. The flux through the pathway is completely dependent on the first step. Under these conditions, no other step in the pathway can affect the flux. The effect is however dependent on the complete insensitivity of the first step to its product. Such a situation is likely to be rare in real pathways. In fact the classic rate limiting step has almost never been observed experimentally. Instead, a range of limitingness is observed, with some steps having more limitingness (control) than others.

We can also derive the concentration control coefficients for the simple two step pathway:

Three step pathway 

Consider the simple three step pathway:

where D the denominator is given by

Note that every term in the numerator appears in the denominator, this ensures that the flux control coefficient summation theorem is satisfied.

Likewise the concentration control coefficients can also be derived, for 

And for 

Note that the denominators remain the same as before and behave as a normalizing factor.

Derivation using perturbations 

Control equations can also be derived by considering the effect of perturbations on the system. This will have a number of effects, it will increase  which in turn will increase  which in turn will increase . Eventually the system will settle to a new steady state. Because we are only considering small changes we can express the change  in terms of  using the relation

We can express these changes by summing the two individual contributions:

Because we allowed the system to settle to a new steady state we can also state that the change in reaction rates must be the same (otherwise it wouldn't be at steady state). That is we can assert that . With this in mind we equate the two equations and write

Solving for the ratio  we obtain:

In the limit, as we make the change  smaller and smaller, the left-hand side converges to the derivative :

We can go one step further and scale the derivatives to eliminate units.

The scaled derivatives on the right-hand side are the elasticities,  and the scaled left-hand term is the scaled sensitivity coefficient or concentration control coefficient, 

We can simplify this expression further.

Using this result gives:

A similar analysis can be done where  is perturbed.

The above expressions measure how much enzymes  and  control the steady state concentration of intermediate . This is often of importance to metabolic engineers who are interested in increasing rates of production.

The above expressions tell us how much enzymes  and  control the steady state flux. The key point here is that changes in enzyme concentration, or equivalently the enzyme activity, must be brought about by an external action.

Properties of a linear pathway 

A linear chain of enzyme-catalyzed reaction steps without a negative feedback loop is the simplest pathway to consider. The figure below shows a three-step linear chain.

Analytical solutions for the control coefficients can be obtained if we assume simple mass-action kinetics on each reaction step:

If we recall that the equilibrium constant for this simple reaction is:

we can modify the mass-action kinetic equation to be:

Given the reaction rates, the differential equations describing the rates of change of the species can be described. For example, the rate of change of  will equal:

By setting the differential equations to zero, the steady-state concentration for the species can be derived, from which the pathway flux equation can also be determined.

Inserting either  or  into one of the rate laws will give the steady-state pathway flux, :

A pattern can be seen in this equation such that, in general, for a linear pathway of  steps, the steady-state pathway flux is given by:

Note that the pathway flux is a function of all the kinetic and thermodynamic parameters. This means there is no single parameter that determines the flux completely. If  is equated to enzyme activity, then every enzyme in the pathway has some influence over the flux. Given the flux expression, it is possible to derive the flux control coefficients by differentiation and scaling of the flux expression. This can be done for the general case of  steps:

This result yields two corollaries:

 The sum of the flux control coefficients is one. This confirms the summation theorem.
 The value of an individual flux control coefficient in a linear reaction chain is greater than or less than one: 

For the three-step linear chain, the flux control coefficients are given by:

where  is given by:

Given these results, there are some immediate observations:

 If the equilibrium constants are smaller, control tends to get distributed across all three steps.

The reason why control gets more distributed is that with more moderate equilibrium constants, perturbations can more easily travel upstream as well as downstream. For example, a perturbation at the last step, is better able to influence the reaction rates upstream, which results in an alteration in the steady-state flux.

An important result can be obtained if we set all  equal to each other. Under these conditions, the flux control coefficient is proportional to the numerator. That is:

If we assume that the equilibrium constants are all greater than 1.0, then since earlier steps have more  terms, it must mean that earlier steps will, in general, have high larger flux control coefficients. In a linear chain of reaction steps, flux control will tend to be biased towards the front of the pathway.  From a metabolic engineering or drug-targeting perspective, preference should be given to targeting the earlier steps in a pathway since they have the greatest effect on pathway flux. Note that this rule only applies to pathways without negative feedback loops.

Metabolic control analysis software 

There are a number of software tools that can directly compute elasticities and control coefficients:

 COPASI (GUI)
 PySCeS (Python)
 SBW (GUI)
 Tellurium (Python)
 VCell

Relationship to Classical Control Theory 

Classical Control theory is a field of mathematics that deals with the control of dynamical systems in engineered processes and machines.  In 2004 Brian Ingalls published a paper that showed that classical control theory and metabolic control analysis were identical. The only difference was that metabolic control analysis was confined to zero frequency responses when cast in the frequency domain whereas classical control theory imposes no such restriction. The other significant difference is that classical control theory has no notion of stoichiometry and conservation of mass which makes it more cumbersome to use but also means it fails to recognize the structural properties inherent in stoichiometric networks which provide useful biological insights.

See also 
 Branched pathways
 Biochemical systems theory
 Control coefficient (biochemistry)
 Flux (metabolism)
 Moiety conservation
 Rate-limiting step (biochemistry)

References

External links 
The Metabolic Control Analysis Web

Biochemistry methods
Metabolism
Mathematical and theoretical biology
Systems biology